Clanculus quadricingulatus is a species of sea snail, a marine gastropod mollusk in the family Trochidae, the top snails.

Description
The height of the depressed conoidal shell attains 6.2 mm, its diameter 6.9 mm.

Distribution
This marine species is endemic to Australia and occurs off South Australia.

References

quadricingulatus
Gastropods of Australia
Gastropods described in 1941